Harry Styles – Live on Tour was the debut concert tour by English singer Harry Styles in support of his self-titled debut album (2017). The tour was announced on 28 April 2017 and additional dates were added on 8 June. The two-part tour began with intimate venues in 2017 and continued on to arenas in 2018. The tour started on 19 September 2017 in San Francisco and concluded on 14 July 2018 in Inglewood, comprising 89 shows.

Background
In June 2016, it was confirmed that Styles had signed a recording contract as a solo artist with Columbia Records. In April 2017, Styles released his debut single, "Sign of the Times", and his self-titled debut album on 12 May 2017.

The tour dates for 2017 were announced on 28 April 2017 via Twitter and his website. Tickets went on sale on 5 May. The tour was sold-out in seconds due to the relatively small sizes of the venues. Styles elected to play smaller venues for his first shows to allow fans the opportunity for a more intimate live experience. On 6 June, MUNA was announced as the supporting act for his 2017 North American and European dates. On 8 June, Styles added 56 new dates in Europe, Asia, Australia, Latin America, and North America for 2018, revisiting many of the previous stops and playing larger venues. The opening acts for the tour were announced the same day, with Kacey Musgraves in the U.S. and Canada, Warpaint in Asia, and Leon Bridges in Latin America.  Due to high demand, additional seats were added in a 360 setup for the North American stops in 2018. On 29 November, Mabel  and The Preatures were announced as the opening acts for Europe and Australia respectively. Styles exclusively wore custom Gucci designed by Alessandro Michele for his stage outfits in 2017. In addition to Gucci, Styles also wore custom Calvin Klein 205W39NYC designed by Raf Simons, as well as Alexander McQueen, Harris Reed, Givenchy, and Saint Laurent outfits on tour in 2018.

Critical reception 

The tour garnered almost universal praise. Eve Barlow of Billboard described Styles as "a true rockstar" and wrote, "He was made to be the frontman. [...] His Jagger-meets-David Cassidy persona shines out on the swaggering "Only Angel" and "Woman". Rob Sheffield of Rolling Stone marvelled at Styles' "superhuman enthusiasm", writing, "A year into his solo rebirth, he’s earned his stripes as a master of every rock & roll move, wearing the tradition like it’s a coat he had tailored just for him." Sheffield continued that Styles is "the ultimate fusion of Mick Jagger’s yin and Paul McCartney’s yang [...] to the point where encountering them at peak strength in the same star can get bewildering". Writing for Los Angeles Times, August Brown lauded the show as "one of the best arena rock shows of the last few years", taking particular note of the stage production which was "classy and minimal, relying on the strength of the songs and Styles’ charm as a live performer." Sabrina Barr of The Independent praised Styles for his "undeniably impressive vocal range", adding, "Most performers can only dream of having the charisma and star quality that Harry Styles naturally exudes."

The Irish Timess Louise Bruton wrote that Styles "proves his superstar status easily but he maintains a sincere level of modesty throughout the entire show, making him more personable than a lot of his pop star peers", and praised his vocals on slower songs, calling him "very much in a league of his own". Matt Miller of Esquire complimented Styles' sensitivity in regards to inclusivity ("aggressively inclusive" according to Rolling Stone) after seeing "teens carrying rainbow hats, shirts, and even one pride flag attached to a Black Lives Matter sign in the front row", saying "[Styles reminds] us that youths are here, they're aware, and they actually care."

Commercial performance 
According to Billboard, tickets for the 2017 shows sold out in seconds across 29 markets. Globe’s pre-sale for the concert at Mall of Asia Arena in Manila broke Coldplay’s record of six minutes by selling out in 52 seconds. The second of the two final shows at The Forum in Inglewood, California, tallied more than 17,000 paid tickets and beat the record for the most paid tickets for a single show since the venue reopened in 2014. Additionally, record amounts of merchandise were sold in over 50 venues in North and South America, Australia, and Europe, according to Live Nation.

Pollstars 2018 Mid-Year report ranked the tour at No. 13 on the Top 100 Worldwide Tours list and No. 20 on Top 100 North American Tours list in terms of gross, and No. 8 on Top 100 Tours list for number of tickets sold worldwide. Styles was the third top-selling touring act of Summer 2018 in the U.S., fifth in Canada and Argentina, and eighth in Brazil on StubHub.

Charity work 
The tour raised a total of $1.2 million in charity donations from ticket and merchandise sales for 62 charities around the world, and registered hundreds of new voters in the U.S. via the non-profit organisation HeadCount. Styles also partnered with the environmental non-profit Reverb, and engaged in a major effort for water conservation that saved the equivalent of 10,000 single-use water bottles by fans, and 3,200 by the band and crew, and recycled more than 6,500 gallons of water from buses, offices, dressing rooms and other backstage areas. Styles released two T-shirts in celebration of Pride, with his phrase, 'Treat People With Kindness' as well as  all proceeds going to support GLSEN's work ensuring safe and inclusive schools for LGBTQ youth.

Set list
{{hidden
| headercss = background: lavender; font-size: 100%; width: 100%;
| contentcss = text-align: left; font-size: 100%; width: 100%;
| header = 2017
| content =
This set list is representative of the show on 19 September 2017 in San Francisco. It is not intended to represent all concerts for the 2017 tour.

 "Ever Since New York"
 "Two Ghosts"
 "Carolina"
 "Stockholm Syndrome" 
 "Sweet Creature"
 "Only Angel"
 "Woman"
 "Meet Me in the Hallway"
 "Just a Little Bit of Your Heart" 
 "What Makes You Beautiful" 
 "Kiwi"
Encore
"From the Dining Table"
 "The Chain" 
 "Sign of the Times"
}}
{{hidden
| headercss = background: lavender; font-size: 100%; width: 100%;
| contentcss = text-align: left; font-size: 100%; width: 100%;
| header = 2018
| content = This set list is representative of the show on 11 March 2018 in Basel. It is not intended to represent all concerts for the 2018 tour.

 "Only Angel"
 "Woman"
 "Ever Since New York"
 "Two Ghosts"
 "Carolina"
 "Stockholm Syndrome" 
 "Just a Little Bit of Your Heart" 
 "Medicine"
 "Meet Me in the Hallway" 
 "Sweet Creature"
 "If I Could Fly" 
 "Anna"
 "What Makes You Beautiful"
 "Sign of the Times"
Encore
"From the Dining Table"
 "The Chain"
 "Kiwi"
}}

Shows

Personnel
Band
 Mitchell Rowland – guitar, vocals 
 Clare Uchima – keyboard, vocals
 Sarah Jones – drums, vocals
 Adam Prendergast – bass, vocals

References

2017 concert tours
2018 concert tours
Harry Styles concert tours
Concert tours of North America
Concert tours of the United States
Concert tours of Canada
Concert tours of Mexico
Concert tours of Europe
Concert tours of the United Kingdom
Concert tours of France
Concert tours of Germany
Concert tours of Ireland
Concert tours of Oceania
Concert tours of Australia
Concert tours of New Zealand
Concert tours of South America
Concert tours of Asia
Concert tours of Japan